Hunter Blake Wood (born August 12, 1993) is an American professional baseball pitcher for the Sultanes de Monterrey of the Mexican League. He previously played in Major League Baseball (MLB) for the Tampa Bay Rays, Cleveland Indians, and Texas Rangers.

Career
Wood attended Rogers Heritage High School in Rogers, Arkansas. He was drafted by the Boston Red Sox in the 32nd round of the 2012 Major League Baseball draft but did not sign and played college baseball at Howard College.

Tampa Bay Rays
Wood was drafted by the Tampa Bay Rays in the 29th round of the 2013 MLB draft and signed. He made his professional debut that year with the Princeton Rays and spent the whole season there, going 3–3 with a 3.80 ERA in 16 starts. He pitched 2014 with the Hudson Valley Renegades and Bowling Green Hot Rods, compiling a combined 4–4 record and 3.35 ERA in 19 starts, and 2015 with Bowling Green and Charlotte Stone Crabs where he posted a 2–7 record and 2.20 ERA in 29 games (ten starts). After the 2015 season he pitched in the Arizona Fall League. Wood started 2016 with Charlotte, and was later promoted to the Montgomery Biscuits. In 21 games (18 starts) between the two clubs he pitched to a 9–5 record and 2.39 ERA. Wood started 2017 with the Montgomery Biscuits.

Wood was called up to the Tampa Bay Rays for the first time on May 30, 2017. He made his MLB debut that day, pitching  of an inning against the Texas Rangers in a 9–5 loss. He was optioned back to Montgomery the next day and promoted to the Durham Bulls in June, where he spent the remainder of the season. In 31 games (18 starts) between Montgomery and Durham he posted a 7–5 record and 4.60 ERA. Wood began 2018 with Durham, but was recalled to Tampa Bay on April 17, where he was often utilized as an opener. For the season, Wood made 29 appearances, 8 starts for the Rays, finishing with a record of 1–1 in 41 innings. Wood came to Spring Training with the Rays in 2019, but was optioned to Minor League camp in late March. Wood started the 2019 season with Durham, but was recalled by the Rays on April 8.

Cleveland Indians
Wood was traded, along with Christian Arroyo, to the Cleveland Indians on July 28, 2019, in exchange for minor league outfielder Ruben Cardenas and international signing period slot money.

Wood was designated for assignment by the Indians on July 23, 2020. After clearing waivers, he was outrighted to the Indians' alternate training site roster on July 25, 2020. He became a free agent on November 2, 2020.

Texas Rangers
On January 19, 2021, Wood signed a minor league contract with the Texas Rangers organization and was invited to Spring Training. On May 15, 2021, Wood was selected to the active roster. In 5 appearances for Texas, Wood recorded a 3.60 ERA. On June 4, Wood was placed on the 60-day injured list with a mild UCL sprain. Wood later underwent surgery with a recovery timetable of at least 8 months. However, he did not undergo Tommy John surgery, instead undergoing a procedure which installed an internal brace in his elbow. On October 9, Wood elected free agency.

Minnesota Twins
On May 27, 2022, Wood signed a minor league deal with the Minnesota Twins. He elected free agency on November 10, 2022.

Sultanes de Monterrey
On March 3, 2023, Wood signed with the Sultanes de Monterrey of the Mexican League.

References

External links

1993 births
Living people
People from Rogers, Arkansas
Baseball players from Arkansas
Major League Baseball pitchers
Tampa Bay Rays players
Cleveland Indians players
Texas Rangers players
Howard Hawks baseball players
Princeton Rays players
Hudson Valley Renegades players
Bowling Green Hot Rods players
Charlotte Stone Crabs players
Mesa Solar Sox players
Montgomery Biscuits players
Durham Bulls players
Columbus Clippers players
Round Rock Express players